Erling Hokstad (born 7 August 1940) was a Norwegian football midfielder and later manager.

He spent his playing career in Eidsvold Turn. Following an injury, he started his managing career in the same club, and attended the Norwegian School of Sport Sciences.

After four seasons in Kongsvinger, Strømmen and Stabæk, he returned to Eidsvold Turn in 1980. He continued through 1985, but also managed the Norwegian women's national team from 1983. His major achievement was the gold medal in the 1987 UEFA Women's Championship.

After a stint on the Norwegian men's second tier with Lyn in 1990, he managed Holter IF from 1991 through 1994, guiding the team to the third tier in Norway.

References

1946 births
Living people
People from Nannestad
Norwegian footballers
Eidsvold TF players
Association football midfielders
Norwegian football managers
Kongsvinger IL Toppfotball managers
Strømmen IF managers
Stabæk Fotball managers
Norway women's national football team managers
UEFA Women's Championship-winning managers
Lyn Fotball managers
Sportspeople from Viken (county)